Kalateh-ye Bojdi (also Romanized as Kalāteh-ye Bojdī; also known as Kalāt-e Bojdīn, Bojd, Bojdī, Kalāteh-i-Būjd, Kalāteh-ye Bojīr, and Kalāteh-ye Būzhadī) is a village in Alqurat Rural District, in the Central District of Birjand County, South Khorasan Province, Iran. At the 2006 census, its population was 173, in 50 families.

References 

Populated places in Birjand County